Lorica, a Latin word literally meaning "body armour", may refer to:

 A number of types of Ancient Roman military clothing:
Lorica hamata, a hauberk of mail
Lorica musculata, a folk term for a muscle cuirass
Lorica plumata, a shirt of ribbed scales resembling feathers
Lorica squamata, a shirt of metal scales
Lorica segmentata, a cuirass of metal plates
 Lorica (prayer), an invocation in the Christian monastic tradition
 Leiden Riddle, one of the Enigmata by the Anglo-Saxon poet Aldhelm
 Loriga, Serra da Estrela in central Portugal, originally named Lorica by the Romans
 Santa Cruz de Lorica, a small Colombian town in the province of Córdoba
 Lorica (material), a type of artificial leather
 Lorica (chiton), a genus of chiton
 Litoria lorica, a species of frog
 Lorica (biology), a structure secreted by some of the protozoans
 A basket-shaped "house" formed by choanoflagellates
 A protective covering surrounding flagellated cells of some algae groups